Tabb is a surname. Notable people with the surname include:

Alf Tabb (1883−1976), English rider of miniature bicycles
Barrington Tabb (born 1934), English painter
Bill Tabb (fl. 1985–1998), American professional wrestler known as The Black Assassin
Brandon Tabb (born 1995), American basketball player
Bruce Tabb (1927–2022), New Zealand accountancy academic
Derrick Tabb (born 1975), American musician
George Tabb, American punk rock musician
Jaimi Tabb (born 2001), Australian rules footballer
Jay Tabb (born 1984), Anglo-Irish professional football player
Jerry Tabb (born 1952), American baseball player
John B. Tabb (1845–1909), American poet and priest
Mary Decker-Tabb (born 1958), American middle-distance runner
Michaela Tabb (born 1967), British snooker and pool referee
Ron Tabb (born 1954), American long-distance runner
Wendell Tabb (born 1962), American educator and actor
William Barksdale Tabb (1840–1874), Confederate army officer
Winston Tabb, American librarian

See also
 Tabb (disambiguation)